Janet Trafton Mills (born December 30, 1947) is an American politician and lawyer serving as the 75th governor of Maine since January 2019. She previously served as the Maine Attorney General on two occasions.

A member of the Democratic Party, Mills was first elected attorney general by the Maine Legislature on January 6, 2009, succeeding G. Steven Rowe. Her second term began on January 3, 2013, after the term of William Schneider. She was the first woman to hold the position. Before her election, she served in the Maine House of Representatives, representing the towns of Farmington and Industry. Her party nominated her for governor in the 2018 election, and she won, defeating Republican Shawn Moody and independent Terry Hayes. On January 2, 2019, she became Maine's first female governor. Mills was reelected in 2022.

Early life and education
Mills was born in Farmington, Maine, the daughter of Katherine Louise (Coffin) and Sumner Peter Mills Jr. Her mother was a schoolteacher and Congregationalist, while her father was a lawyer who served as U.S. Attorney for Maine in the 1950s. Mills graduated from Farmington High School in 1965. As a teenager, she spent nearly a year bedridden in a full-body cast due to severe scoliosis, which was corrected surgically.

Mills briefly attended Colby College before moving to San Francisco, where she worked as a nursing assistant in a psychiatric hospital. She later enrolled at the University of Massachusetts Boston, from which she graduated with a bachelor of arts degree in 1970. During her time at UMass, Mills traveled through Western Europe and became fluent in French. In 1973 she began attending the University of Maine School of Law and in 1974 she was a summer intern in Washington, D.C., for civil rights attorney Charles Morgan Jr. of the American Civil Liberties Union. Mills graduated with a Juris Doctor in 1976 and was admitted to the bar.

Early political career
Mills was Maine's first female criminal prosecutor and was an assistant attorney general from 1976 to 1980, prosecuting homicides and other major crimes. In 1980, she was elected district attorney for Androscoggin, Franklin and Oxford counties, a position to which she was reelected three times. She was the first woman district attorney in New England. In 1994, Mills was an unsuccessful candidate for the United States Congress in the Democratic primary to replace then-Representative Olympia Snowe. She placed third, losing to John Baldacci.

Mills co-founded the Maine Women's Lobby and was elected to its board of directors in 1998.

In 2000, Mills served as a field coordinator for Bill Bradley's 2000 presidential campaign in Maine. In 2002, she was elected to the Maine House of Representatives. There, she served on the judiciary, criminal justice, and appropriations committees.

Attorney general of Maine 
Mills was elected to her fourth term when the Joint Convention convened in December 2008 to elect the new attorney general. She became Maine's 55th attorney general on January 6, 2009. When Republicans gained control of the Maine legislature in 2010, Mills, was not reelected. In January 2011, she was elected vice chair of the Maine Democratic Party. She joined the law firm Preti Flaherty in February 2011 as a lawyer with the firm's Litigation Group in its Augusta office. After Democrats regained control of the legislature in the 2012 elections, Mills was again chosen as attorney general, resigned as vice chair of the Maine Democratic Party, and took the oath of office as attorney general on January 7, 2013. She was reelected on December 3, 2014, despite the Maine Senate coming under Republican control.

Republican Governor Paul LePage opposed Mills being attorney general, due to many disputes between them over the legality of some of LePage's policies. On January 28, 2015, he requested the Maine Supreme Judicial Court's opinion as to whether the governor's office needed the attorney general's office's permission to retain outside counsel when the attorney general declines to represent the State in a legal matter. LePage did so after Mills twice declined to represent him in matters she determined had little legal merit, though she approved his requests for outside lawyers. On May 1, 2017, LePage sued Mills, asserting that she had abused her authority by refusing to represent the state in legal matters, or taking a legal view contrary to the LePage administration's.

Governor of Maine

Elections

2018

On July 10, 2017, Mills announced that she would seek the Democratic nomination for governor of Maine in 2018. One of several candidates in the primary, she won the nomination in June, finishing first after four rounds of ranked-choice voting gave her 54% to her closest competitor's 46%.

In the general election, Mills faced Republican nominee Shawn Moody, independent Maine State Treasurer Terry Hayes, and independent businessman Alan Caron. Endorsed by every major newspaper in Maine and the Boston Globe, buoyed by major ad buys from Democratic political action committees and receiving Caron's endorsement a week before the polls closed, Mills was elected with 50.9% of the vote to Moody's 43.2%. She became Maine's first female governor, the first Maine gubernatorial candidate to be elected with at least 50% of the vote since Angus King in 1998, and the first to win at least 50% of the vote for a first term since Kenneth M. Curtis in 1966. She received over 320,000 votes, more than any governor in the state's history.

Mills's campaign was aided in part by a Democratic super PAC that financed Maine-themed ads meant to attract young voters on social media. Both Mills and outside groups outspent Moody by an average of $15 per vote cast, for a total of $10.7 million.

2022

Mills ran for reelection in 2022. She faced no opposition in the primaries, making her the Democratic nominee. In the general election she defeated the Republican nominee, former governor Paul LePage, securing a second term. She received over 373,000 votes, breaking the record for the most votes ever cast for a gubernatorial candidate, set four years earlier.

Tenure 
One of Mills's first acts as governor was to sign an executive order to carry out the expansion of Maine's Medicaid program as called for by a 2017 referendum, something LePage had refused to do. This fulfilled a major campaign pledge. Mills also dropped work requirements for Medicaid that LePage requested toward the end of his tenure and that had the Trump Administration's approval. She said the work requirements "leave more Maine people uninsured without improving their participation in the workforce".

Mills revived the tradition of Maine governors attending Martin Luther King Day commemoration events in Portland, doing so in 2019.

In September 2019, United Nations Secretary-General António Guterres asked Mills to speak at the General Assembly on climate change. Mills told world leaders at the UN that she intends to make Maine carbon neutral by 2045. She was the first sitting Maine governor to address the General Assembly.

On June 11, 2021, Mills announced the end of the state of emergency started on March 15, 2020, due to the COVID-19 pandemic. The state of emergency ended on June 30, 2021.

On June 24, 2021, Mills vetoed seven bills, including one that would have closed the Long Creek Youth Development Center, a juvenile prison. The vetoes received harsh rebuke from progressive Democrats in the Legislature.

On April 20, 2022, Mills signed into law the Maine state supplemental budget, which included free community college for students of the class of 2020, 2021, 2022 and 2023.

Political positions
Mills identifies as a moderate Democrat and has often broken the party line with other members of her caucus.

Abortion
Mills has taken steps to expand access to abortion procedures, signing legislation to mandate that both public and private insurance agencies include abortion procedures within the scope of their coverage. After the leak of the 2022 Supreme Court decision in Dobbs v. Jackson Women's Health Organization, Mills reaffirmed her position that "unlike an apparent majority of the Supreme Court, I do not consider the rights of women to be dispensable."

Drugs
Mills has expressed her opposition to the decriminalization of small possessions of drugs.

Environmental issues
Mills has enacted regulations to curb the use of materials that harm the environment. One such policy, prohibiting the use of plastic bags by Maine retailers, went into effect on April 22, 2020. She also signed into law a ban on the use of styrofoam containers by various industries within the state. This regulation became effective on January 1, 2021.

In 2019, the Central Maine Power Company was granted all necessary permissions to begin work on a corridor running from Beattie Township to a power grid in Lewiston, Maine. Despite Mills's initial skepticism of the proposal and pushback from critics, changes to the budget caused Mills to sign the agreement.

Mills has also enacted regulatory standards for the quality of water on Indigenous reservations used for sustenance fishing.

During her remarks at the UN General Assembly, Mills pledged that Maine would have a carbon-neutral economy by 2045.

LGBT rights
Mills supports LGBT rights. In May 2019, she signed a bill banning conversion therapy, the pseudoscientific practice aimed at changing one's sexual orientation, from being used on minors. One year earlier, the same bill had passed both chambers of the Maine Legislature, but was vetoed by then-Governor Paul LePage. In June 2021, she officially declared June LGBTQ+ Pride Month.

Sports betting
Mills has expressed her opposition to the regulation of sports betting.

Tribal relations
Mills has taken steps to improve relations with Maine's native tribes, despite her prior rocky relationship with them as attorney general. This includes signing a bill to replace the Columbus Day state holiday with Indigenous People's Day and pledging to work to fill seats on a state-tribal commission that had been left empty under her predecessor. She also signed a bill to establish stricter water quality standards for rivers used by Maine's tribes for sustenance fishing, something long sought by the tribes. It also ended a legal dispute between the tribes and the state, for which Mills as attorney general had defended the state's position.

As governor-elect, Mills said that the use of Native American imagery and nomenclature associated with Maine School District 54 and its Skowhegan establishment was "a source of pain and anguish" for the state's Indigenous population. After taking office, she signed into law a measure to ban the use of such references in public schools.

Personal life
In 1985, Mills married real estate developer Stanley Kuklinski, with whom she had five stepdaughters and three stepgrandsons and two stepgranddaughters. Kuklinski died due to the effects of a stroke on September 24, 2014. She is the sister of Peter Mills (a former Republican state senator and gubernatorial candidate in 2006 and 2010), Dora Anne Mills, and Paul Mills.

Electoral history

See also
List of female governors in the United States
List of female state attorneys general in the United States

References

External links 

 Governor Janet T. Mills official government website
 Janet Mills for Maine campaign website
 
 
 Janet Mills at On the Issues

|-

|-

|-

|-

|-

|-

|-

|-

1947 births
21st-century American politicians
21st-century American women politicians
Democratic Party governors of Maine
Living people
Maine Attorneys General
Maine lawyers
Democratic Party members of the Maine House of Representatives
People from Farmington, Maine
University of Maine School of Law alumni
University of Massachusetts Boston alumni
Women state legislators in Maine
Women state governors of the United States
Women state constitutional officers of Maine